Li Hao (born 29 August 1994) is a Chinese wheelchair fencer. He won two gold medals in the men's sabre A event and team foil event at the 2020 Summer Paralympics held in Tokyo, Japan. He also won two World Championship medals.

References 

Living people
1994 births
Place of birth missing (living people)
Chinese male foil fencers
Chinese male sabre fencers
Wheelchair fencers at the 2020 Summer Paralympics
Medalists at the 2020 Summer Paralympics
Paralympic gold medalists for China
Paralympic medalists in wheelchair fencing
Paralympic wheelchair fencers of China
21st-century Chinese people